Diversum is the sixth full-length studio album by the Norwegian progressive metal band In the Woods..., released on November 25, 2022.

Track listing

References

2022 albums
In the Woods... albums